Kate Beahan (born 12 October 1974) is an Australian film actress.
Beahan was born in Perth. She appeared mostly in movies and TV series in Australia. Her best-known American film role was playing Sister Willow Woodward in the 2006 horror remake The Wicker Man opposite Nicolas Cage.

Her father, Michael Beahan, was an Australian Labor Party Senator from Western Australia from 1987 to 1996.

Filmography

Film

Television

External links
 

Australian film actresses
Australian people of Irish descent
Living people
1974 births
Actresses from Perth, Western Australia
21st-century Australian actresses